Jaime Velásquez Suárez (born 14 July 1962) is a Mexican equestrian. He competed in the individual eventing at the 1992 Summer Olympics.

Notes

References

External links
 
 

1962 births
Living people
Mexican male equestrians
Olympic equestrians of Mexico
Equestrians at the 1992 Summer Olympics
Pan American Games medalists in equestrian
Pan American Games bronze medalists for Mexico
Equestrians at the 1991 Pan American Games
Central American and Caribbean Games gold medalists for Mexico
Competitors at the 2002 Central American and Caribbean Games
Competitors at the 2010 Central American and Caribbean Games
Place of birth missing (living people)
Central American and Caribbean Games medalists in equestrian
Medalists at the 1991 Pan American Games
20th-century Mexican people
21st-century Mexican people